Elachista maculicerusella is a moth of the family Elachistidae found in Europe.

The moth flies from May to August depending on the location. The head is whitish. Forewings are ochreous- whitish ; sometimes two or three dark fuscous spots near base ; cloudy dark fuscous fasciae in middle and at 3/4,sometimes obsolete towards costa, anterior including black plical stigma. Hindwings are grey.The larva is pale yellow ; head brown ; 2 with two faint brown spots.

The larvae mine the stems of reed canary-grass (Phalaris arundiacea), common reed (Phragmites australis) and other grasses on occasion. The mine starts at the leaf tip and descends as an irregular blotch mine. The mine is flat and quite shallow. The frass is initially deposited in the oldest, upper part of the mine, but later in strings. The larva may leave the mine and restart elsewhere. Pupation takes place outside of the mine.

Gallery

References

maculicerusella
Leaf miners
Moths described in 1859
Moths of Europe
Taxa named by Charles Théophile Bruand d'Uzelle